Fəxrəddin Şahbazov (22 January 1950, Baku, Azerbaijan – 20 November 1991, Khojavend, Azerbaijan) was a National Hero of Azerbaijan, and warrior during the Nagorno-Karabakh conflict.

Early life and education 
Shahbazov was born on 22 January 1950 in Baku, Azerbaijan SSR. In 1967, he completed his secondary education at the Secondary School No. 20 in Baku. From 1969 through 1971, Shahbazov served in the Soviet Armed Forces. In 1972, he started to work at the Television and Radio Broadcasting Company of Azerbaijan.

Personal  life 
Shahbazov was married and had two children.

Nagorno Karabakh War 
The forceful expulsion of Azerbaijanis from Upper Karabakh and nowadays Armenia by Armenians since 1988 also worried Fakhraddin Shahbazov. He volunteered for the front-line, prepared reports from battlefields and broadcast them in the country and abroad. Despite repeated encounters with dangerous situations, he continued to go to the front-line as a reporter. In 1991, the Armenians committed unimaginable atrocities in the Khojavend District. Civilians were killed, villages were burned. 

On November 20, government officials and a number of other individuals departed for Khojavend on a Mi-8 helicopter to investigate these events. Near the village of Garakend in Khojavend, Armenians attacked the helicopter with heavy machine-gun fire. The Armenians did not even hesitate to insult their dead bodies.

Memorial and legacy 
By Decree of the President of Azerbaijan No. 344 dated December 4, 1992, Fakhraddin Shahbazov was posthumously awarded the title of "National Hero of Azerbaijan".  He was buried in the Martyrs' Lane in Baku. One of the streets in the Rasulzade settlement is named after him.

See also 
 First Nagorno-Karabakh War
 National Hero of Azerbaijan
 1991 Azerbaijani Mil Mi-8 shootdown

References

Further reading 
Vugar Asgarov. Azərbaycanın Milli Qəhrəmanları (Yenidən işlənmiş II nəşr). Bakı: "Dərələyəz-M", 2010, səh. 265.

1950 births
1991 deaths
Military personnel from Baku
Azerbaijani military personnel of the Nagorno-Karabakh War
Azerbaijani military personnel killed in action
National Heroes of Azerbaijan
Assassinated Azerbaijani journalists